"Ready for Whatever" is a song by American rapper T.I., released on September 23, 2008, as the sixth single from his sixth studio album, Paper Trail (2008). The song was produced by Southern hip hop record producer Drumma Boy. 

In a 2014 interview for HipHopDX, Drumma Boy revealed that "Ready for Whatever" had to be edited at least 25 different times, at the request of T.I.'s lawyers, because of the song's detailing of his 2007 arrest for gun possession.

Release
The song was released on September 23, 2008, during the Countdown to Paper Trail on iTunes.

Track listing
Digital download
"Ready for Whatever" [Explicit] – 5:14

Chart performance

Release history

References

2008 singles
2008 songs
T.I. songs
Songs written by T.I.
Grand Hustle Records singles
Atlantic Records singles
Song recordings produced by Drumma Boy
Songs written by Drumma Boy